Saint George is an unincorporated community in Kankakee County, Illinois, United States.  It was one of several populated places in the area settled largely by Metis and French Canadians in the 1840s.

References

Populated places established in the 1840s
Unincorporated communities in Illinois
Unincorporated communities in Kankakee County, Illinois